WNTC (790 AM) is a radio station broadcasting in Ashland City, Tennessee, United States, which broadcasts a country music format branded as Q Country 103.9. Day power is 2,000 watts and night power is 35 watts.

FM translator
WNTC relays its programming to FM translators in order to widen the coverage area, especially during nighttime hours when the AM frequency decreases power to 35 watts.

History
There have been several callsigns and formats over the years; the current one consists of Mainstream County and is the Flagship for Cheatham County Central High School Sports.

The then-WQSV signed off on June 8, 2013 due to insufficient advertising support from area businesses. The station's studio and transmitter site were sold in a foreclosure sale to Community Bank & Trust on June 14. A deal was reached to sell WQSV to Lightning Broadcasting in September 2013; Lightning is controlled by Neil Peterson, who also owns WSGI and WDBL in Springfield. The station changed its call sign to WJNA on December 9, 2013.

On February 7, 2019, Fowler Media Partners began operating WJNA under a local marketing agreement and changed the station's format from southern gospel to classic country, simulcasting WVWF 105.1 FM Waverly, under new WVWK call letters. The station has since relaunched separate original programming under the brand name The Bear.

On June 26, 2019, the station changed its call sign to WBWR. The next day, owner Sycamore Valley Broadcasting closed on the sale of the station and the W280FN translator to Mike Parchman's Consolidated Media LLC at a purchase price of $100,000.

On January 9, 2020, the station changed its call sign to WVWZ. On February 22, 2021, the station changed its call sign to WCHQ and rebranded as "Q Country 103.9". The call sign changed again to WNTC on July 22.

References

External links
Q Country 103.9 & 790 Facebook

NTC (AM)
Classic country radio stations in the United States
Radio stations established in 1985
1985 establishments in Tennessee